Nadir Leghari (born as Nadir Akmal Khan Leghari) is a Pakistani politician who served as the Provincial Minister of Sindh for Irrigation and Power from 2002 till 2007.

He joined Imran Khan's Pakistan Tehreek-e-Insaf in 2010, and was elected President of its Sindh Chapter in March 2013 and the Chairman of Insaf Professionals Forum-Sindh. He was part of the Pakistan Muslim League (Q) government in 2002. He lost his seat (PS-7 Ghotki-III) to the Pakistan Peoples Party’s Sardar Ahmed Ali Khan Pitafi in the 2008 general elections and did not contest the 2013 general elections.

Sardar Nadir Akmal Khan Leghari is a graduate and has been active in the agriculture and business sector. His wife is a businesswoman. He has two children.

References

Living people
Sindh MPAs 2002–2007
Year of birth missing (living people)